Jackson Percy Enright (November 29, 1895 – August 18, 1975) was a Major League Baseball pitcher. In 1 career game, he had a 0–1 record with a 5.40 ERA. He batted and threw right-handed.

Enright was born in Fort Worth, Texas and died in Pompano Beach, Florida.

External links
Baseball Reference.com page

1895 births
1975 deaths
New York Yankees players
Major League Baseball pitchers
Baseball players from Fort Worth, Texas
San Antonio Bronchos players
Newark Indians players
Richmond Virginians (minor league) players
Shreveport Gassers players
Chattanooga Lookouts players
New Haven Weissmen players
Jersey City Skeeters players
Newark Bears (IL) players